Gustav Adolfs torg is the name of several squares in Sweden.

Gustav Adolfs torg, Stockholm
Gustaf Adolfs torg, Göteborg
Gustav Adolfs torg, Malmö
Gustav Adolfs torg, Helsingborg